Hasjim Djalal is a former Indonesian Ambassador to Germany, Canada, and the United Nations.

Biography
Djalal was born in Ampek Angkek, Bukittinggi, West Sumatera on 25 February 1934. He is an international law of the sea expert, and the former Chairman & President of the International Seabed Authority. He received his Masters of Law from the University of Virginia where he was the University's first Indonesian Student.  Djalal is the father of Dino Patti Djalal, the former Indonesian Deputy Foreign Minister.

References

1934 births
People from Bukittinggi
Living people
Ambassadors of Indonesia to Canada
Ambassadors of Indonesia to Germany
Permanent Representatives of Indonesia to the United Nations